The Alexander Graham Bell Association for the Deaf and Hard of Hearing, also known as AG Bell, is an organization that aims to promote listening and spoken language among people who are deaf and hard of hearing. It is headquartered in Washington, D.C., with chapters located throughout the United States and a network of international affiliates.

History 
The Association was originally created as the American Association to Promote the Teaching of Speech to the Deaf (AAPTSD). In 1908 it merged with Alexander Graham Bell's Volta Bureau (founded in 1887 "for the increase and diffusion of knowledge relating to the deaf"), and was renamed as the Alexander Graham Bell Association for the Deaf in 1956 at the suggestion of Mrs. Frances Toms, the mother of a deaf son who was able to achieve high academic standings in mainstream schools with the organization's help. In 1999 the Association was finally renamed to the Alexander Graham Bell Association for the Deaf and Hard of Hearing.

Controversies and criticism 
The organization has a long history of stanch opposition to any positive depictions of the use of sign language, which the organization views as a threat to speech development. After NBC broadcast a theater performance using ASL in 1967, the organization wrote a letter to the company demanding that the show be pulled, claiming that sign language was artificial and foreign and that showing it on television was destroying the efforts of parents who tried to teach their deaf children speech. However, NBC refused to cave in to their demands. Later on in 2008 the organization also protested the 2008 Pepsi commercial at the Super Bowl that showed signing; the organization's statement insisted that Pepsi should have used the money for the commercial to sponsor hearing aids and other hearing assistance technology instead of promoting sign language. In 1992 the organization issued a resolution stating its opposition to the use of sign language in deaf education, and although the 2008 position statement does not explicitly condemn ASL, the organization continues to discourage its use, promoting exclusively oral methods that forbid the use of sign language, mainly the Auditory-Verbal and Auditory-Oral approaches.

The foundation has been heavily criticised for misleading and inaccurate claims made in relation to the use of American Sign Language among the Deaf community after Nyle DiMarco was announced as the winner of season 22 of America's Next Top Model. The Registry of Interpreters for the Deaf, the National Association of the Deaf, the National Black Deaf Advocates and academics accused the foundation of inaccuracy, bias, pseudoscience, xenophobia and eugenics.

The organization is heavily sponsored by cochlear implant and hearing aid companies.

References

Further reading 
 A.A.P.T.S.D. The Association Review: 1906, Philadelphia, Penn.: American Association to Promote the Teaching of Speech to the Deaf. Retrieved from the Internet Archive, June 7, 2012.   Note: this review has been inadvertently listed on the Internet Archive as The Association Review: 1899, although some metadata correctly identifies it as from the year 1906.

Alexander Graham Bell
Deafness organizations